Debug_new refers to a technique in C++ to overload and/or redefine operator new and operator delete in order to intercept the memory allocation and deallocation calls, and thus debug a program for memory usage. It often involves defining a macro named DEBUG_NEW, and makes new become something like new() to record the file/line information on allocation. Microsoft Visual C++ uses this technique in its Microsoft Foundation Classes. There are some ways to extend this method to avoid using macro redefinition while still able to display the file/line information on some platforms.

There are many inherent limitations to this method. It applies only to C++, and cannot catch memory leaks by C functions like malloc. However, it can be very simple to use and also very fast, when compared to some more complete memory debugger solutions.

See also
Memory debugger

External links
A Cross-Platform Memory Leak Detector
DEBUG_NEW (MFC)

Software testing tools
Memory management software
Articles with underscores in the title